is a railway station  on the Meitetsu Nagoya Main Line located in Minami-ku, Nagoya, Japan.

History
Moto Hoshizaki Station was opened on May 8, 1917, as a station on the Aichi Electric Railway. On April 1, 1935, the Aichi Electric Railway merged with the Nagoya Railroad (the forerunner of present-day Meitetsu). The station has been unattended since September 2004.

Lines
Meitetsu
Meitetsu Nagoya Main Line

Layout
Moto Hoshizaki Station has two opposed side platforms.

Platforms

Adjacent stations

External links
 
  Meitetsu Station information

Railway stations in Japan opened in 1917
Stations of Nagoya Railroad
Railway stations in Aichi Prefecture